Madison Heights is a neighborhood in Pasadena, California. It is bordered by California Boulevard to the north; Lake Avenue, Arden Road, Oak Knoll Avenue, Oak Knoll Circle, and El Molino Avenue to the east; Allendale, Los Robles Avenue, and South Pasadena to the south, and Marengo Avenue to the west.

Education
Madison Heights is home to Allendale Elementary School and Blair International Baccalaureate School. The neighborhood is served by McKinley and Hamilton Elementary Schools, and McKinley Middle Schools.

Transportation
Madison Heights is served by Pasadena Transit route 20.

Government
Madison Heights is split between City Council District 6, represented by Steve Madison, and District 7, represented by Andy Wilson.

Neighborhoods in Pasadena, California